Félix Pérez (born November 14, 1984) is a Cuban professional baseball outfielder for the Toros de Tijuana of the Mexican Baseball League, and Yaquis de Obregón of the Mexican Pacific League.

Career
Prior to playing in the Reds system, he played in the Cuban National Series. He first played for Isla de la Juventud in 2005-2006, hitting .246. He also pitched briefly. The next season, he hit .287 in 84 games, again pitching briefly, and in 2007-2008, he hit .257 with 20 doubles in 90 games.

Cincinnati Reds
Signed by the Reds by scout Richard Jimenez, Perez hit over .300 twice in his first four seasons in the USA. He split 2010 between the DSL Reds, with whom he hit .429 in 16 games, the Lynchburg Hillcats (.338 batting average in 16 games) and the Carolina Mudcats (.266 batting average in 35 games), for a composite .322 batting average. He committed 8 errors in 2011 for Carolina while hitting .257 in 92 games; he also hit .206 with two walks and a homer in nine games for the Louisville Bats, for a combined .252 batting average in 101 games. He hit .301 and had 16 assists defensively in 116 games for Louisville in 2012. In 2013, he batted .262 with 10 home runs and 65 RBI in 126 games for Louisville, while fielding .995.

During 2014 Perez posted some of his best numbers.  He played for the AAA Louisville Bats the entire season, appearing in 122 games.  He finished the season with a batting average of .280 and had a slugging percentage of .450. He accrued 74 RBI's (the team high), 12 home runs (second highest on his team), 36 doubles (the team high) and an OPS of .775.   Defensively, he committed just 3 errors.  He was elected to the International League All-Star team and hit a double and a triple during the AAA All-Star game.

Sultanes de Monterrey
He played for the Sultanes de Monterrey in 2015 and hit .312 with 20 home runs and 70 RBI in 94 games. He played for Caracas again that winter and produced at a .332/.425/.545 clip with 20 doubles in 55 games. He again supplemented another team in the Caribbean Series, this time joining the Tigres de Aragua. He hit .200/.407/.200 with 7 walks in six games. He also made a couple errors at first, including a crucial one with a two-run lead in the 7th inning of the finale against Mexico's Venados de Mazatlán that enabled them to score the tying run en route to a comeback win.

Rakuten Golden Eagles
He played for the Rakuten Golden Eagles in 2016, hitting .304/.371/.543 with 19 home runs and 68 RBI between them - only .244 with 5 home runs in 22 game for Rakuten, .315 with 14 home runs in 64 games for Monterrey.

Second stint with Sultanes de Monterrey
He returned to Monterrey for the 2017 season, appearing in 28 games and hitting .284/.359/.500 with 6 home runs and 23 RBIs before he was placed on the reserve list for the rest of the season on May 7, 2017. He became a free agent after the season.

Rieleros de Aguascalientes
On March 22, 2018, Pérez signed with the Rieleros de Aguascalientes of the Mexican League.

Third stint with Sultanes de Monterrey
He was traded back to the Sultanes de Monterrey on August 7, 2018. Pérez did not play in a game in 2020 due to the cancellation of the Mexican League season because of the COVID-19 pandemic.

Bravos de León
On February 2, 2021, Pérez was traded to the Bravos de León of the Mexican League.

Toros de Tijuana
On December 18, 2021, Pérez was traded to the Toros de Tijuana of the Mexican League in exchange for the rights to RHP Mitch Lively.

References

External links

NPB

1984 births
Living people
Águilas del Zulia players
Bravos de León players
Carolina Mudcats players
Defecting Cuban baseball players
Dominican Summer League Reds players
Cuban expatriate baseball players in the Dominican Republic
Leones de Ponce players
Cuban expatriate baseball players in Puerto Rico
Leones del Caracas players
Cuban expatriate baseball players in Venezuela
Louisville Bats players
Lynchburg Hillcats players
Mexican League baseball first basemen
Mexican League baseball right fielders
Nippon Professional Baseball outfielders
Rieleros de Aguascalientes players
Sultanes de Monterrey players
Tigres de Aragua players
Tohoku Rakuten Golden Eagles players
Tomateros de Culiacán players
Toronjeros de Isla de la Juventud players
Toros de Tijuana players
Venados de Mazatlán players
Cuban expatriate baseball players in Mexico
People from Isla de la Juventud